"Strange Things Happening Every Day" is a traditional African American spiritual.

It was most famously, and influentially, recorded by Sister Rosetta Tharpe in late 1944, becoming a hit record in 1945.  Released as a single by Decca Records, Tharpe's version featured her vocals and resonator guitar, with Sammy Price (piano), bass and drums.  It was the first gospel record to cross over and become a hit on the "race records" chart, the term then used for what later became the R&B chart, and reached #2 on the Billboard "race" chart in April 1945.

Background
A National Public Radio article commented that "Rock 'n' roll was bred between the church and the nightclubs in the soul of a queer black woman in the 1940s named Sister Rosetta Tharpe".

Influence
The recording has been cited as both an important precursor of rock and roll,  and also considered by some to be a contender for the title of first rock and roll record.

Other versions
In recent years, versions of the song have also been recorded by Michelle Shocked, Johnny Cash, Linda Gail Lewis, Tom Jones, and Sleepy LaBeef.
In 2020, Vika and Linda released a version as the second single from their album, Sunday (The Gospel According to Iso).

References

1944 songs
1945 singles
Gospel songs